Phanogomphus descriptus, the harpoon clubtail, is a species of clubtail dragonfly in the family Gomphidae. It is found in eastern North America.

Phanogomphus was formerly considered to be a subgenus of Gomphus, but phylogenetic studies have resulted in its promotion to genus rank.

References

Further reading

 
 

Gomphidae
Insects described in 1896